Enlace is a Latin American Christian-based broadcast television network. The network primarily broadcasts faith-based programming targeted to the Hispanic community. Enlace's primary headquarters are in San José, Costa Rica, with studios, offices, and call centers in most Latin American countries.

In the United States, Enlace is distributed by Trinity Broadcasting Network (as Enlace TBN). Its broadcast facilities are located in Irving, Texas.

Around the world, the channel is aired free-to-air via satellite as well on Digital terrestrial television in Peru, Costa Rica, Spain, Panama and Bolivia.

History 
Jonas González Rodriguez first got the idea for Enlace in 1981, and in 1984 Rodriguez sent a letter to Costa Rica's national Radio control department. On July 17, 1986, he was awarded television license under Number 167 for use of the channel 23 UHF frequency in the Metropolitan region of Costa Rica.

1987 saw the establishment of an office in San Antonio, TX in the Continental Building. In August 1988, TBN founder Paul Crouch donated a driver with 10 watts to Channel 23. Later engineer Ricardo Jarquín installed the first transmitter for Channel 23. Channel 23 began transmitting on September 9, 1988. In January 1990 they installed a transmitter with 1000 watts in the Irazú volcano. During 1991 a trademark was filed for the name Enlace. In 1992 Channel 23 began expansion progress. The channel installed three repeaters in Limón, Santa Elena and Cerro de la Muerte. In 1994, Channel 23 opened its first studio. Later on August 2 of that year Channel 23 began transmitting vía satellite during TBN's flagship program Praise the Lord.

In 1996 Enlace launched on the Mexican satellite Soldaridad 2 transmitting 24 hours a day, extending their signal all over Latin America. During 1998 they changed their satellite to Pas-5 extending all over Europe. In 2000 they changed their satellite again to Pas-9, also on that year Enlace Juvenil TV was launched. In 2002 TBN Enlace USA was launched as part of TBN's digital lineup alongside The Church Channel and JCTV. In 2003, Enlace started transmitting on the satellites Hispasat-1C and Hotbird 6 extending to the Middle East. In 2005, Enlace started transmitting on Galaxy 23 and Galaxy 19 extending to North America. In 2006 they moved transmission to the satellite Galaxy 14.

In 2007, Enlace started infrastructure changes in Costa Rica. Also, on that year Enlace launched on the Nossa TV platform in Brazil transmitting on its satellite Galaxy 28. In 2008, Enlace and Enlace Juvenil received new imagery and look. Also on that year Enlace started transmitting on DirecTV Latin America for the first time on their satellite Galaxy 3C.

Background  
The network's lineup consists of faith programs including church services, music videos, concerts, talk shows, children's programs, and movies. Over 80% of its programs are produced in Latin America by ministries such as Claudio Freidzon of Argentina, Cash Luna of Casa De Dios in Guatemala, and U.S. Hispanic organizations such as Guillermo Maldonado of Miami, Florida, and Danilo Montero of Lakewood Church in Houston, Texas.

Availability 
The network is accessed via free-to-air satellite. Having been launched in the United States on May 1, 2002, Enlace is currently available through various cable providers nationwide, and is carried over-the-air on digital subchannels of TBN owned-and-operated and affiliated stations, usually on the fourth subchannel. Enlace is also available across North America, including Mexico on Glorystar Christian Satellite. The network is also streamed on Enlace and TBN's official website for use externally in browsers and media players, available at different speeds for dial-up and broadband connections, and is also available through TBN's iOS, Google Play and Roku apps.

On December 16, 2009, DirecTV in the United States began carrying Enlace on channel 448, making it available for part of its various English, Spanish and international packages. In February 2011, Dish Network began carrying Enlace on channel 9411.

References

External links 
 Enlace Internacional

Christian mass media companies
Evangelical television networks
Religious television stations in the United States
Trinity Broadcasting Network
Spanish-language television networks in the United States
Television channels and stations established in 2002